Nandi Bhebhe (c. 1760 – October 10, 1827) was a daughter of Bhebhe, a past Elangeni chief and the mother of Shaka kaSenzangakhona, King of the Zulus.

Birth
Queen Nandi Mohlatsane Bhebhe was born in Melmoth in 1760. Her father was a chief of the Elangeni (Mhlongo) people.

Personal life
Nandi Bhebhe was impregnated out of wedlock by Jama's son, Senzangakhona. The Mhlongo people demanded Senzangakhona pay damages for his non-traditional act. The Mhlongo approached the Jamas to settle the matter. Nandi was on the fore-front of this case and discussion. She personally demanded 55 head of cattle as payment for damages done to her and the herd was delivered to the Mhlongo people. The Jamas and Senzangakhona agreed to pay the damages demanded by Mhlongo people so as to avoid war. On the other hand, Senzangakhona did truly love Nandi. After Nandi gave birth to her son, Shaka, she initially spent some time at Senzangakhona's kraal before her relationship with Senzangakhona deteriorated, forcing her to leave the kraal. Nandi returned to her people, the Mhlongo of Elangeni, leaving Shaka behind. Shaka's life at Senzangakhona's kraal proved dangerous and finally his uncle Mudli brought him to Nandi at Elangeni.<ref>Pathisa Nyathi, Igugu likaMthwakazi: Imbali yamaNdebele, 1820-1893. </ref> During that time Nandi had to protect her son from famine, assassination attempts, and enemies. However, Nandi's stay at Elangeni proved dangerous as well, so she left with her son to live amongst the Qwabe people. There, she met Gendeyana, whom she married and had a son, Ngwadi. Nandi's stay amongst the Qwabe was not pleasant at all and this forced her to leave Qwabe to live amongst the Mthethwa people led by chief Dingiswayo. Nandi was warmly welcomed by the Mthethwa. She found it a good place to raise her sons, Shaka and Ngwadi, and her daughter, Nomcoba. Her son Shaka joined a Chwe regiment led by Bhuza. It was amongst the Mthethwa where Shaka devised military tactics.

Death

Queen Nandi Bhebhe died of dysentery on October 10, 1827. Her grave can be found outside Eshowe, off the old Empangeni road. The grave is marked Nandi. On 11 March 2011 the Mhlongo Committee met at Eshowe with the Office of the KZN (kwaZulu-Natal) Premier and Amafa to finalise plans for Princess Nandi's grave near Eshowe. It was agreed that there would be an official opening day in May 2011 to present Queen Nandi Bhebhe's grave after the approval of the designs suggested by Mhlongo people. Queen Nandi Bhebhe was born into the Mhlongo people and for that reason it was also agreed that the name on the grave shall be "Princess Nandi Mhlongo, Mother of King Shaka". The Bhebhe and Mhlongo people of eLangeni are one people. The direct descendants of King Shaka's mother Nandi have expressed dissatisfaction with the state of her grave which has lain unattended for over 200 years. The Zulu Royal Family blames the government for this because according to them, the graves of prominent people are the responsibility of government. Amafa heritage which administers protected structures in the province will soon erect a sculpture symbolic of Nandi's status once the Mhlongo and the Royal family have settled their differences.

Despite the hard times they endured together, or perhaps because of them, Shaka loved his mother almost to the point of worship.

According to Donald Morris, Shaka ordered that no crops should be planted during the following year of mourning, no milk (the basis of the Zulu diet at the time) was to be used, and any woman who became pregnant was to be killed along with her husband. At least 7,000 people who were deemed to be insufficiently grief-stricken were executed, although the killing was not restricted to humans: cows were slaughtered so that their calves would know what losing a mother felt like.

What Morris states comes from Henry Francis Fynn's memory. Fynn's account has been disputed with some sources alleging that they were exaggerated since he may have had deeper motives. Fynn's earlier accounts were sometimes inaccurate and exaggerated which would become crucial to the growth of Zulu mythology. Many of the first white settlers were illiterate, with the exception of a few who controlled the written record. These writers have been accused of demonizing Shaka as a figure of inhuman qualities, a symbol of violence and terror, to obscure their own colonial agenda.Carolyn Anne Hamilton, (1992) The Character and Objects of Chaka': A Reconsideration of the Making of Shaka as 'Mfecane' Motor, The Journal of African History, Vol. 33, No. 1, pp. 37-63. Julian Cobbing also argues that these settlers' writers were anxious to create a myth which "cover up" colonial 19th-century slave raiding and general rapine across the sub-continent and justify the seizure of land.

References

Further reading
Bryant, Alfred T. (1929). Olden Times in Zululand and Natal. Longmans, Green and Co.

Ritter, E. A. (1955). Shaka Zulu: The Rise of the Zulu EmpireSalmonson, Jessica Amanda (1991). The Encyclopedia of Amazons.'' Paragon House. p. 192. 
Queens Nandi (c. 1764 – c.1827) and Monase (c. 1797 – 1880) by Maxwell Z. Shamase
Benedict Carton, Professor Benedict Carton (2000), Blood from Your Children: The Colonial Origins of Generational Conflict in South Africa

1760 births
1827 deaths
Year of birth uncertain
African queen mothers
18th-century Zulu people
19th-century Zulu people
History of KwaZulu-Natal
African princesses
Deaths from dysentery
Infectious disease deaths in South Africa